Syarhey Khaletski (born 14 April 1984) is a retired Belarusian professional football player. His latest club was Smorgon in 2014.

External links

1984 births
Living people
Belarusian footballers
FC RUOR Minsk players
FC Torpedo Minsk players
FC SKVICH Minsk players
FC Neman Grodno players
FC Belcard Grodno players
FC Partizan Minsk players
FC Slavia Mozyr players
FC Smorgon players
Association football defenders